Sluch may refer to the following rivers:

 Sluch (Belarus), a tributary of the Pripyat in Belarus
 Sluch (Ukraine), a tributary of the Horyn in Ukraine

See also
Słucz, Podlaskie Voivodeship, Poland